This is an index of lists of people by cause of death, in alphabetical order of cause.

Deaths due to the Chernobyl disaster (including list of victims)
List of fatalities from aviation accidents
List of deaths through alcohol
List of deaths from anorexia nervosa
List of people who were beheaded
List of choking deaths
List of deaths due to COVID-19
List of racing cyclists and pacemakers with a cycling-related death
List of drowning victims
List of deaths from drug overdose and intoxication
List of people killed in duels
List of deaths from legal euthanasia and assisted suicide
List of people executed by lethal injection
List of people who were executed
List of hazing deaths in the United States
List of horse accidents (deaths and serious injuries)
List of inventors killed by their own inventions
List of marathon fatalities
List of deaths by motorcycle crash
List of deaths on eight-thousanders (mountains)
Lists of murders
List of NASCAR fatalities
List of pneumonia deaths
List of poisonings
List of prison deaths
List of driver deaths in motorsport
List of people who died in traffic collisions
List of skiing deaths
List of fatal cougar attacks in North America
List of fatal snake bites in the United States
List of fatal shark attacks in the United States
List of fatal shark attacks in Australia
List of fatal shark attacks in South Africa
List of fatal shark attacks in Réunion
List of fatal alligator attacks in the United States
List of fatalities due to wingsuit flying
List of spaceflight-related accidents and incidents
List of Spanish flu cases
List of people who died of starvation
List of notable stunt accidents
List of selfie-related injuries and deaths
List of suicides
List of television actors who died during production
List of tuberculosis cases
List of volcanic eruption deaths
List of unusual deaths
List of women who died in childbirth

See also
 Deaths by cause
 List of causes of death by rate

 
People by cause of death